Andrzej Maria Rzymkowski (born 21 June 1911 in Kraków, d. 1986 in Koszalin) was a Polish architect and professor at the Wrocław University of Science and Technology and the Tadeusz Kościuszko University of Technology.

He was son of Jan and Ludwika.

Rzymkowski graduated in 1939 at the Lwów Polytechnic. In 1950 he became Doctor of Engineering at the Warsaw University of Technology.

Publications 
  (1954, 2nd edition 1958, 3rd edition 1963)
  (1954, 2nd edition 1956)
  (1966, 2nd edition 1967)
  (1972)
  (1973)
  (1973)
  (1954, editor)
  (1957, editor)
  (1964, editor)
  (1975)
  (1976)
  (1979)
  (1981)

Footnotes

References

Architects from Kraków
1911 births
1986 deaths